Færder Lighthouse is a coastal lighthouse in the municipality of Færder in Vestfold og Telemark, Norway. The lighthouse is located on the archipelago Tristein, three small islands in the outer Oslofjord. It was first lit in 1857 as a replacement of the former Store Færder Lighthouse. The lighthouse was listed as a protected site in 1997.

Færder Lighthouse is the second-oldest in Norway.

Climate
Færder has a continental climate (Dfb) that is heavily moderated by the ocean.

See also

Lighthouses in Norway
List of lighthouses in Norway

References

External links
 
 Norsk Fyrhistorisk Forening 

Lighthouses completed in 1857
Lighthouses in Vestfold og Telemark
Listed lighthouses in Norway
1857 establishments in Norway